The WWL Tag Team Championship is a professional wrestling world tag team championship in WWL. It was established as the tag team title for the promotion on July 7, 2013.

History
On February 24, 2018, four champion teams -La Revolución presenting WWC, Westside Mafia representing WWL, Los Fujitivos representing CWA and Smoke and Nightmare representing CWS- competed in a match where the team pinned would drop their titles to the winners. The Westside Mafia was not involved in the result, which saw the CWA titlists best their CWS counterparts.

On February 2, 2019, incumbents Los Primos Meléndez became involved in another interpromotional storyline, when CWA World Tag Team Champions Los Fujitivos challenged them. For Todo o Nada, both sets are scheduled to be on the line in an unification match that also includes the Latin American Xchange besides the titlists.

Title history

References

Tag team wrestling championships
World Wrestling League Championships